Dypsis lanceolata is a species of flowering plant in the family Arecaceae. It is found only in Comoros.

References

lanceolata
Flora of the Comoros
Vulnerable plants
Taxa named by Odoardo Beccari
Taxonomy articles created by Polbot